James F. "Jim" Hahn (born October 25, 1935) was the Iowa State Senator from the 40th District. He served in the Iowa Senate since 2005.  He received his diploma from Muscatine High School in 1953 and has worked as a real estate salesperson since 1989.

Career 
Hahn served on several committees in the Iowa Senate – the Appropriations committee; the Economic Growth committee; the Labor and Business Relations committee; and the State Government committee.  He also served as the ranking member on the Administration and Regulation Appropriations Subcommittee.  His prior political experience includes serving as a representative in the Iowa House from 1990 to 2004.

Hahn was elected in 2004 with 14,485 votes (54%), defeating Democratic opponent Thomas L. Fiegen.

References

External links 
Senator James F. Hahn official Iowa Legislature site
Senator James F. Hahn official Iowa General Assembly site
Senator James Hahn at Iowa Senate Republican Caucus
 

Republican Party Iowa state senators
1935 births
Living people
Republican Party members of the Iowa House of Representatives
People from Muscatine, Iowa
American real estate brokers
Muscatine High School alumni